Martin Kryštof (born 11 October 1982) is a Czech male volleyball player. He is part of the Czech Republic men's national volleyball team and he participated at the 2010 FIVB Volleyball Men's World Championship in Italy. On club level he currently plays for Jihostroj České Budějovice as libero. He used to play for Vavex Pribram, VK Dukla Liberec and SCC Berlin.

References

1982 births
Living people
Czech men's volleyball players
Czech expatriate sportspeople in Germany
Expatriate volleyball players in Germany